Cebbala Ouled Asker, is a town and commune in the Sidi Bou Zid Governorate, Tunisia. As of 2004 it had a population of 2,506.

See also
List of cities in Tunisia

References

Populated places in Tunisia
Communes of Tunisia
Tunisia geography articles needing translation from French Wikipedia